Wura may refer to:

 Wura, Queensland, a locality in the Rockhampton Region, Australia
 WURA, a Tejano broadcast radio station licensed to Quantico, Virginia, serving Metro Washington